Jo-Wilfried Tsonga was the defending champion, but withdrew before the tournament began.

Karen Khachanov won the title, defeating Lucas Pouille in the final, 7–5, 3–6, 7–5.

Seeds
The top four seeds who played received a bye into the second round.

Draw

Finals

Top half

Bottom half

Qualifying

Seeds

Qualifiers

Lucky loser
  Sergiy Stakhovsky

Qualifying draw

First qualifier

Second qualifier

Third qualifier

Fourth qualifier

References
 Main draw
 Qualifying draw

Open 13 Provence - Singles
2018 Singles